Dato Paduka Awang Haji Shofry bin Haji Abdul Ghafor (born 21 October 1958) is a Bruneian diplomat who served as Permanent Representative of Brunei Darussalam to the United Nations from 2002 to 2006.

He was educated at the University of East Anglia (BA, Development Studies) and at the Australian National University (MA, International Studies).

References

1958 births
Living people
Permanent Representatives of Brunei to the United Nations
Bruneian diplomats
Alumni of the University of East Anglia
Australian National University alumni